The W type carriages were wooden passenger carriages used on the railways of Victoria, Australia.

History
Following World War I patronage on the Victorian Railways increased significantly, and there were insufficient high capacity carriages for the busiest routes. To overcome the problem, the W design was adjusted, with a longer and wider body, to produce the Long W series. The vehicles entered service from 1926.

Design and Construction
They retained the curved (arched) style of roof, as previously employed on the last fifteen short W cars.

The single-class passenger vehicles had one compartment reserved for ladies and two compartments reserved for smoking. They were also fitted with single-gender lavatories at each end, and vestibules (with lock-able doors) for walking through to other cars in a given train. There was a water fountain located about halfway down the corridor in each car.

Details

AW cars
The final batch of AW cars was constructed in 1926 and 1927, again fitted with curved roofs, and numbered 60AW to 68AW. Cars 69AW and 70AW were ordered but not built. These new cars were capable of seating 70 people across 7 compartments, again one reserved for ladies and two for smoking.

In December 1937, the newest carriages, 60AW to 68AW, were converted to add 2nd-class capacity to the system.

Note that 60AW-63AW and 65AW were built in 1926, while 64AW and 66AW-68AW were built in 1927.

They were converted from AW to BW in December 1937, then returned to AW in 1955–56, and to VFW in 1972. The VFW's that were reconverted back to BW's were converted in 1979, while VFW's 3, 4 & 6 were converted to MT's in 1983. 7VFW was sold in 1983 as well.

The cars were used for special excursion trips, generally scouting or defence 'specials' that required one train.

When the VFW cars were returned to broad gauge in the 1980s, bogies were sourced from scrapped Tait carriages.

ABW cars
From 1926, new curved roof, longer and wider stock was constructed and numbered 60ABW to 63ABW and 65ABW.

Although diagrams are not available, photos appear to indicate that the long version of the ABW design, with the curved roof, was set out internally in much the same way as the shorter carriages. A side-on view on the Steamrail Flickr site indicates that three first-class compartments were included, much the same as the design of the short carriages, while four second-class compartments are provided in place of three. Therefore, it is likely that again, the outer two compartments were for smoking passengers, the inner two compartments were for ladies with a seat cut-out in each to make way for the door to the ladies' lavatory.

About 1981, cars 61ABW-63ABW were converted to 80BW-82BW and 65ABW was converted to 31MT. 60ABW had been scrapped in 1974.

The cars ran until the late 1980s when replaced by the then-new 'N' sets.

BW cars
In 1926 and 1927, cars 60BW to 70BW were added to the fleet. The additional width and length allowed them to seat 68 people; 64 across eight compartments, plus two in each vestibule.

In 1937/1938, nine were converted from AW cars, to the 71BW–79BW range. This was a result of an increase in second-class passengers. These were converted back to AW cars by the late 1950s. in 1980, the cars were again renumbered back to 71BW to 79BW, after spending some time as Standard Gauge 'second division' cars (the VFW class).

In 1981, BW 80–82 were converted from ABW 61–63, though it is not clear what the capacity of those vehicles was.

As a trial it was decided in 1982 to re-letter 67BW and 70BW to BWL, indicating the larger seating capacity. However, the trial was terminated and no more were re-lettered.

In the preservation era, 62BW and 80BW were retrofitted with small kiosks replacing a single compartment. It is thought that the kiosk in 62BW may have been taken from 7BV or a guards van.

62BW appeared in the season one episode "The Copy" of Round the Twist, and were used for filming of scenes between Healesville and Yarra Glen.

64AW, 64BW & 64ABW
An interesting note is that 64ABW was never built, and never entered service. Peter J. Vincent's theory is that 64ABW was not built in the 1926 batch because of confusion between the 64-foot length of the new cars, and carriage number 64.

Also, 64AW and 64BW each entered service a year after their batch-counterparts, in 1927 instead of 1926. This was supposedly to reduce confusion. However, an extra ABW was not needed, and so instead of building 64ABW, the VR probably used its parts to construct one of 65AW to 68AW. This cannot be substantiated, but is the most likely explanation.

Dining cars

Two new dining cars were built in 1927, named respectively Avoca and Hopkins. These had a similar underframe to the standard E type carriage, but the body design was a much closer match to the latter half of the Long W type carriages, using steel plates rivetted to the frame, and a curved roof was fitted. The cars were so heavy, at over 70 tons, that they had to be placed on Tait Motor-car bogies to support the tremendous weight. Aside from the three Pullman cars, these were the heaviest items (by axle load) of rollingstock to run in Victoria, possibly until modern times. Couplings were an oddity; the two were fitted with standard screw couplings when new, but by late 1935 they were both converted to autocouplers. A few months later they went to transition couplings, then back to proper autocouplers in 1936. Inside, the cars were partitioned at about the half-way mark, with 48 seats arranged in a 2+2 with 12 tables saloon configuration. Beyond this was a counter/buffet area facing the dining area; a corridor then ran along one side of the kitchen area, with the rest of the car devoted to a kitchen and food preparation area. This was a distinct change from the layout of the E type dining cars, which had a central kitchen area with the first class dining facilities at one end, and second class at the other.

Avoca and Hopkins were used on the Melbourne-Adelaide train in lieu of the earlier models.

Avoca was converted to airconditioning in early 1936, as the second carriage on the VR network to have this modification following 36AE. In 1937 it was used as the standby for the Spirit of Progress, in case the Dining Car was not available at the time. The cars quickly became known as Iron Tanks by most rail workers, or nicknamed "Hell" by crew members who had to work in the kitchen section with its huge wooden fuel stove, which was not airconditioned. Crew members could regularly be seen gasping for fresh air at open windows. The car was painted into blue/gold in December 1953 for the royal train. The old briquette stove was replaced in April 1969 with a Porta-gas model. Roller bearings were added in the late 1960s, and the bogies were completely replaced in 1973 with a then-modern fabricated design, reclaimed from Spirit of Progress carriages. These were suitably modified to support the tremendous weight of Avoca which tended to sway about on rough track. In May 1984, as part of the New Deal rollingstock renumbering, Avoca was given a new identity of RS235, the first time it had been considered as part of the S fleet. Around this time the car was repainted into a "heritage" livery, reminiscent of the dark maroon with yellow lining applied to the first E cars when they were built. Today, Avoca is owned by Victrack and under the care of the Seymour Rail Heritage Centre.

Hopkins had a similar history to Avoca except that it was not airconditioned, up to February 1950. It was then sold to the Commonwealth railways, reclassed as DB75, fitted with airconditioning and converted to standard gauge, entering service in November of that year. On 19 February 1952 it had been repainted into the Commonwealth Railways colour scheme and by December 1954 new bogies of the BK type were fitted. It was used mainly on the Trans-Australian Express, and later on the Ghan. It was written off on 29 March 1968, possibly as surplus to requirements.

Sleeping cars
Three sleeping cars were constructed by the Victorian Railways in 1928 to supplement those used on the Mildura and other overnight services. They used a similar internal arrangement to the last two E type sleepers, Buchan and Wando, but were wider with steel panels used in lieu of timber slats for the sides, and a curved roof matching the Long W carriages. Ten single-sided compartments were fitted, each capable of seating four second-class sitting passengers or two sleeping passengers along one wall. The cars were initially painted in standard VR dark red, and rostered for use on the Melbourne to Mildura overnight trains.

While the cars were generally similar to the earlier joint-stock sleeping cars, they were exclusively built for use on the Victorian Railways system. Like Buchan and Wando the lounge area was replaced with a tenth sleeping compartment, which was slightly larger than the others. To avoid confusion, in 1939 they were renumbered Sleeping Cars No.1, 2 and 3 in build order (with Buchan and Wando becoming 4 and 5 respectively) in lieu of names. Around the same time they were fitted with air conditioning systems powered by axle-mounted generators, and repainted into blue and gold.

Unlike the earlier cars, Werribee, Indi and Ovens were fitted with second-class bench seats in lieu of first class, so they had capacity for 40 sitting passengers in day form.

Current status
Steamrail Victoria maintains Werribee and Indi in the West Block of Newport Workshops.

Ovens is with the Seymour Rail Heritage Centre, stabled under cover at their depot in Seymour, Victoria.

In service

First delivery phase, 1926
60AW-63AW, 65AW, 60ABW-63ABW, 65ABW, 60BW-63BW & 65BW

Second delivery phase, 1927
64AW, 66AW-68AW, 64BW & 66BW-70BW

Standard Gauge service – VFW
VFW 7 is at Junee Roundhouse Museum

New Deal, the abolition of wooden rollingstock and preservation
The W type carriages were slowly phased out of service from 1981 as part of the 'New Deal' reforms of passenger rail operations, with a number going into preservation. They are now shared by Steamrail Victoria and other rail preservation groups. Being a mainstay on the Victorian Railways network for so long, the W-series has a large number of representatives still in service today. However, when the time for preservation rolled around the longer, wider cars were preferred due to their higher seating capacity and as a result, most of these are higher-numbered.

At Healesville's Yarra Valley Railway, car 63AW (as 34MT) is stored pending restoration. 62BW were recently reduced to underframe only, as the timber in the carriages had rotted beyond repair.

The Mornington Railway has 65AW in service and has 63ABW stored pending overhaul from the former South Gippsland Tourist Railway.

As of 2013, Steamrail's business plan recorded 64AW, 63ABW, 60BW, 61BW, 63BW, 67BW and 68BW as serviceable; carriages 65BW (underframe only), 66BW, 70BW, 71BW (ex 60AW) and 80BW (ex 61ABW) were marked as stored; 80BW has since been transferred to Maldon. Until late 2008, 62AW was also stored on-hand, see below.

The Victorian Goldfields Railway borrowed 80BW (ex 61ABW) from Steamrail, from 23 June 2012. This car was swapped for 67BW, which returned to the Steamrail depot on the same day.

68AW is privately owned and currently numbered 79BW.

Around 2008–2012 a number of stored carriages had to be moved around Newport to make way for new suburban stabling. When this was attempted it was found that a number of carriages had been left in the open for too long, and were beyond repair. As a result, 62AW (as 32MT), 64BW and 69BW, which had been in storage at the "Tarp Shop" yard, was scrapped sometime between 28-Sept-2008 and 01-Oct-2008. At the same time other yards were being sorted through, and it was found that Healesville's 62BW was beyond repair. Both of these have been reduced to underframes.

Model railways
Kits are produced by Steam Era Models for the short, clerestory-roofed AW and BW carriages; these can be kitbashed into the longer type carriages, except for the additional width required for accuracy. Resin-cast curved roofs are available for purchase separately in both short and long versions, from either Blue and Gold models, or End of the Line Hobbies in Adelaide. The latter company also offers kit construction services, so it is possible to have a carriage built and posted.

Samhongsa produced a series of the long W type carriages in brass a few decades back, individually packed. The range included red boarded-sides 60AW, 61AW, 62AW; 60BW, 62BW, 65BW; 60ABW, 62ABW, 65ABW and, in blue, 1VFW, 2VFW and 3VFW. In plain sides, the range included 64AW, 66AW, 67AW; 64BW, 66BW, 67BW and, in blue, 5VFW, 6VFW and 7VFW.

Trainbuilder has produced models of Werribee, Indi and Ovens in VR Blue/Gold, for $525 each.

References

External links
 Peter J. Vincent: AW – First Class Sitting cars
 Peter J. Vincent: ABW – First/Second Class cars
 Peter J. Vincent: BW & BWL – Second Class Sitting cars
 Peter J. Vincent: CW – Passenger Guards Vans
 Peter J. Vincent: VFW – Second Class Sitting cars, Standard Gauge
 Peter J. Vincent: MT  – Rail Motor Trailers
 Steamrail-owned W cars
 Railpage thread

Victorian Railways carriages